Lan Yang Institute of Technology (LYIT) is a private college in Toucheng Township, Yilan County, Taiwan.

History
LYIT was originally established as Fushin Junior College of Technology in March 1966. In 1983, it was renamed Fushin Institute of Technology. In 2001, the school was upgraded to Lan Yang Institute of Technology.

In 2018, the university had a concern on the low admission to their school, which resulted in the planned closures of many of its departments.

Faculties
 Department of Digital Marketing
 Department of Fashion Beauty Design
 Department of Health and Leisure Management
 Department of Hospitality Management
 Department of Interior Design
 Department of Mechatronics Engineering
 Department of Tourism and Travel Management

Transportation
The campus is accessible within walking distance northwest from Toucheng Station of the Taiwan Railways.

See also
List of universities in Taiwan

References

External links

 

1966 establishments in Taiwan
Educational institutions established in 1966
Private universities and colleges in Taiwan
Universities and colleges in Yilan County, Taiwan
Universities and colleges in Taiwan
Technical universities and colleges in Taiwan